The Crown Prince of Thailand (or Siam; ; ; lit. the royal son of Siam) is a title held by the heir apparent to the Thai throne. First created by King Chulalongkorn (Rama V) in 1886, for his son Prince Maha Vajirunhis, the king's eldest son by a royal wife Queen Savang Vadhana. Prior to this, the Siamese throne did not have a law or formal system regulating the royal succession. In 1688 King Petracha of Ayutthaya created the title of Front Palace, which by the Rattanakosin period had become the main title granted to the heir presumptive to the throne. However few Front Palaces have succeeded to the throne this way, with the exception of King Buddha Loetla Nabhalai (Rama II) in 1809.  After the death of Bovorn Wichaichan in 1885, the title of Front Palace was abolished and replaced with the title of Crown Prince, who became heir apparent to the throne.

In 1924 King Vajiravudh (Rama VI) promulgated the 1924 Palace Law of Succession to regulate the succession, this law essentially barred females, children of commoner wives or children of foreign wives to the throne, it also re-affirmed agnatic primogeniture, or succession through the male-line by seniority. This law also affected the individuals who could become Crown Prince. Since its creation three Princes have been raised to this title, and two have succeeded to the throne.

The title in Thai, Sayammakutratchakuman, comes from conjugation of the words Sayam (Siam), Sanskrit makut (meaning “crown”), ratcha from Sanskrit rāj, and kuman from Sanskrit kumār (meaning “son”).

Crown Princes

Heirs-apparent and heirs-presumptive to the throne
List of heirs apparent and heirs presumptive since 1886, those in bold succeeded to the throne as King.

See also

 1924 Palace Law of Succession
 Monarchy of Thailand
 List of monarchs of Thailand
 Chakri dynasty

References

Citations

Bibliography

OKNation.net, "เจ้านาย" ผู้มีสิทธิ์ในราชบัลลังก์ เมื่อปี พ.ศ. 2477 (จบ) (Thai), September 2009, Retrieved 2010-03-16

 
Succession to the Thai crown
Thai
Thai monarchy-related lists